Ludmila Vaňková (27 May 1927 – 3 February 2022) was a Czech writer.

She is the author of the Lev a růže tetralogy (English: The Lion and the Rose). This consists of the novels Král železný, král zlatý (1977, reprinted 2002), Zlá léta (1978, reprinted 2002), Dědicové zlatého krále (1979, reprinted 2002), and Žebrák se stříbrnou holí (1995, reprinted 2002). She is also the author of Mosty pres propasti casu (1976) and Stříbrný jednorožec (1981).

Vaňková died in February 2022, at the age of 94.

References

Michael Třeštík. "Vaňková Ludmila". Kdo je kdo: osobnosti české současnosti : 5000 životopisů. Agentura Kdo je kdo. 2002. Page 713 Google Books.
"Vaňková Ludmila: Black Saga" (1980) Panorama of Czech Literature, issues 1-4, page 175 Google Books
(1981) Panorama of Czech Literature, issue 2, page 31 Google Books
(1980) 28 Česká literatura: časopis pro literární vědu 384, 387, 388 Google Books
(1987) 103 Slovenské pohl'ady na literatúru, umenie a život 135 Google Books
(1989) 105 Slovenské pohl̓ady 64 Google Books
Blahoslav Dokoupil. Čas člověka, čas dějin: poznámky k vývoji české historické prózy, 1966-1986. Československý spisovatel. 1988. Page 88. Google Books.
Oldřich Sirovátka. Literatura na okraji. Československý spisovatel. 1990. Page 58. Google Books.
Lubomír Machala. "Historicke Prozy". Česká próza 90 let. CERM. 1999. Page 14. Google Books
(1999) 33 Canadian-American Slavic Studies 150 Google Books
"Ludmila Vaňková: Genesis" (2001) Nové knihy, Issues 1-14, page 36 Google Books
"Lucemburská Trilogie: Ctvrtá královská saga Ludmily Vankové" (2001) Nové knihy, issues 1-17, page 30 Google Books
"Ludmila Vaňková: Léc pana z Rozmberka" (2001) Nové knihy, issues 17-35, page 72 Google Books
Celia Hawkesworth. A History of Central European Women's Writing. (Studies in Russia and East Europe). Palgrave Macmillan in association with UCL. 2001. Page 209 et seq. 
Pavel Janoušek and Petr Čornej. Dějiny české literatury 1945-1989. Academia. Prague. 2008. Volume 4 (1969-1989). Page 711. Google Books.
Karel Komárek. Čep, Durych a několik příbuzných: Interpretační studie. Vydavatelství Filozofické fakulty Univerzity Palackého v Olomouci. 2017. Pages 31 and 175.

1927 births
2022 deaths
Czech historical novelists
Czech science fiction writers
Czech women writers
Czech National Social Party politicians
Communist Party of Czechoslovakia politicians
Writers from Prague
Charles University alumni